Roberto Carlos Alvarado Hernández (born 7 September 1998) is a Mexican professional footballer who plays as a winger for Liga MX club Guadalajara and the Mexico national team. He is the youngest player to ever play in Ascenso MX.

Alvarado started his career with second division Celaya in 2013 until 2017, when he began to play in the top-flight Liga MX where he briefly participated with clubs Pachuca and Necaxa, winning the 2016–17 CONCACAF Champions League and Clausura 2018 Copa MX, respectively.

Alvarado participated with the Mexico U-21 side that received second place at the 2018 Toulon Tournament. Following his international and club performances, he would earn his first senior international appearance with Mexico on 7 September 2018 in a friendly match against Uruguay.

Club career

Celaya
Alvarado made his professional debut on 25 September 2013 in the Apertura 2013 Copa MX group stage match against Estudiantes Tecos, coming on as a substitute for Guillermo Clemens on the 59th minute in a 1–0 win. Three days later, he made his league debut, also against Estudiantes Tecos, in a 0–0 draw, coming on as a substitute for René García on the 86th minute. He was 15 years, 21 days of age.

Alvarado scored his first professional goal in the 27th minute of a 1–0 win in a Clausura 2014 Copa MX group stage match against Atlas on 18 February 2014. He had unsuccessful trials with English clubs Manchester United and Sunderland in November 2014, and Leicester City in January 2015. It was not until the Apertura 2016 season that Alvarado truly broke out, scoring six goals in 14 games, and catching the attention of Mexican top-flight teams.

Pachuca
Pachuca acquired Alvarado from Celaya for the Clausura 2017 season. He would go on to score his first goal with the team on 3 March 2017 while trailing from behind 1–0 in a 3–2 victory over Tijuana. Although he only played 9 league games in his lone season with Pachuca, he did make two appearances during their CONCACAF Champions League winning campaign in 2016–17.

Necaxa
Necaxa acquired Alvarado in a deal that involved trading away Edson Puch to Pachuca for the Apertura 2017. On 26 August 2017, he would score his first goal with Necaxa, granting the team a 2–1 win over Atlas. On 14 April 2018, he would score the only goal in Necaxa's 1–0 victory over Lobos BUAP. He became a starter during the Clausura 2018 season. In April, he would attain the Clausura 2018 Copa MX against Toluca.

Cruz Azul
On 21 May 2018, Alvarado joined Cruz Azul. On 21 July, he debuted in a 3–0 league victory against Puebla, playing 84 minutes, eventually being substituted out for Misael Domínguez. On 4 August, Alvarado scored his first goal for Cruz Azul in a 1–0 victory against Tigres UANL. Two weeks later, on 18 August, Alvarado notched three assists in a 3–0 victory against León, causing ESPN to run a story calling Alvarado "a leading light for Cruz Azul" despite his young age. By now he had become a sensation, with the Spanish publication Marca calling the teenager a "Heaven-sent jewel" later that week. Midway through the tournament, Alvarado was considered by the press to be one of the best midfielders in the league. In November, he would help Cruz Azul attain the Apertura 2018 Copa MX against Monterrey, his second in a row.

Guadalajara
On 26 December 2021, Alvarado joined Guadalajara in an exchange that saw Uriel Antuna and Alejandro Mayorga join Cruz Azul. On 12 February 2022, he scored his first goal with Chivas against Tigres UANL on a 1–3 defeat.

International career

Youth
Alvarado was part of the roster that participated at the 2018 Toulon Tournament, where he was the second highest scorer in the tournament with 3 goals, scoring once in the group stage matches against Qatar and China and in the final against England where Mexico lost 2–1. He was called up yet again ahead of the 2018 Central American and Caribbean Games, but Cruz Azul refused to release him for the tournament.

Alvarado participated at the 2020 CONCACAF Olympic Qualifying Championship, appearing in all five matches, where Mexico won the competition. He was subsequently called up to participate in the 2020 Summer Olympics. Alvarado won the bronze medal with the Olympic team.

Senior
On 29 August 2018, Alvarado received his first call-up to the senior national team for the friendly matches against Uruguay and the United States. He made his debut on 7 September, coming on as a second-half substitute for Alan Pulido in their 4–1 loss to Uruguay in Houston.

In May 2019, Alvarado was included in Tata Martino's preliminary roster for the 2019 CONCACAF Gold Cup. The following month, on 5 June 2019, Alvarado scored his first international goal in a 3–1 friendly victory against Venezuela. The following day, he was included in the final list for Gold Cup tournament. He would go on to appear in all matches of the tournament, helping Mexico win the final against rivals the United States.

In October 2022, Alvarado was named in Mexico's preliminary 31-man squad for the 2022 FIFA World Cup, and in November, he was ultimately included in the final 26-man roster.

Style of play
A gifted playmaker whose versatility is his strongest suit, Alvarado is predominantly a central attacking midfielder, capable of playing on either flank as well as a second striker. Technically proficient with both feet, playing on the right allowed the opportunity to cut or drift inside onto his favoured left. He has shown an ability to finish from in and around the box, but comparing his shots on target to shots off target suggests that shooting isn't his strongest attribute. Instead, he focuses on creating opportunities. During his time with Necaxa, Alvarado  was beating defenders on their left and right sides with a variety of methods. The change of pace is Alvarado's favoured technique, and he excels when there's space behind an opponent to race into, but he can also deceive defenders with close control and, at times, thrilling skill. He is excellent at pulling away from defenders to make himself available for a pass and has a remarkable ability to accurately place floated crosses and through balls.
Alvarado plays for his teammates, presses effectively when not in possession and seems to be a balanced character off the field.

He has often been compared to fellow national teammate Diego Lainez, although Alvarado has insisted they both have differing playing styles. Cruz Azul manager Pedro Caixinha has compared Alvarado to João Moutinho.

Personal life
Alvarado is named after the Brazilian footballer Roberto Carlos and the Brazilian singer of the same name. Alvarado is nicknamed El Piojo (The Louse) because of his idol, Argentine former footballer Claudio "El Piojo" López.

Career statistics

Club

International

International goals
Scores and results list Mexico's goal tally first.

Honours
Pachuca
CONCACAF Champions League: 2016–17

Necaxa
Copa MX: Clausura 2018

Cruz Azul
Liga MX: Guardianes 2021
Copa MX: Apertura 2018
Supercopa MX: 2019
Leagues Cup: 2019

Mexico U23
CONCACAF Olympic Qualifying Championship: 2020
Olympic Bronze Medal: 2020

Mexico
CONCACAF Gold Cup: 2019

References

External links
 
  
 
 
 

1998 births
Living people
Footballers from Guanajuato
People from Irapuato
Association football midfielders
Mexican footballers
Mexico international footballers
Mexico youth international footballers
Club Celaya footballers
C.F. Pachuca players
Club Necaxa footballers
Cruz Azul footballers
Liga MX players
Ascenso MX players
Liga Premier de México players
Tercera División de México players
2019 CONCACAF Gold Cup players
CONCACAF Gold Cup-winning players
Footballers at the 2020 Summer Olympics
Olympic footballers of Mexico
Olympic medalists in football
Olympic bronze medalists for Mexico
Medalists at the 2020 Summer Olympics
2022 FIFA World Cup players